The 2013–14 season is Sunderland's seventh consecutive season in the top division of English football, the Premier League.

Squad & coaching staff

Current squad

Out on loan

Backroom staff

Transfers

In

Out

Pre-season and friendlies

Friendlies

Barclays Asia Trophy

Semifinals 

All kick-off times are local (UTC+08:00).

Delayed by 30 minutes due to rain. Game reduced to 80 minutes (40-minute halves).

Delayed by 10 minutes due to rain. Game reduced to 80 minutes (40-minute halves).

Third-place playoff

Final

Competitions

Overall

Premier League

League table

Results summary

Results per matchday

Matches

 

Last updated: 11 May 2014Source: Sunderland AFC

League Cup

FA Cup

Statistics

Appearances

Numbers in parentheses denote appearances as substitute.
Players with no appearances not included in the list.

Last updated on 11 May 2014

Goalscorers
This includes all competitive matches.
Last updated on 11 May 2014

Clean sheets
This includes all competitive matches. 
Last updated on 7 May 2014

Disciplinary record
This includes all competitive matches.
Last updated on 11 May 2014

References

Sunderland A.F.C. seasons
Sunderland